Indian Range is a historic home at Davidsonville, Anne Arundel County, Maryland.  It is a -story frame hip-roofed Carpenter Gothic style country "villa" with board and batten siding, steeply pitched cross gables, and tall, chamfered chimneys.  It was built about 1852.

It was listed on the National Register of Historic Places in 1986.

References

External links
, including photo from 1985, at Maryland Historical Trust
Indian Range, Anne Arundel County. Winter photograph, taken by a resident of the house in 2003.

Houses on the National Register of Historic Places in Maryland
Houses in Anne Arundel County, Maryland
Carpenter Gothic architecture in Maryland
Carpenter Gothic houses in the United States
National Register of Historic Places in Anne Arundel County, Maryland